The Professor of Astronomy at Gresham College, London, gives free educational lectures to the general public. The college was founded for this purpose in 1597, when it appointed seven professors; this has since increased to ten and in addition the college now has visiting professors.

The Professor of Astronomy is always appointed by the City of London Corporation.

List of Gresham Professors of Astronomy
Note, years given as, say, 1596/97 refer to Old Style and New Style dates.

See also
 Astronomer Royal
 Astronomer Royal for Ireland

Notes

References
Gresham College old website, Internet Archive List of professors
 Some Historical Astronomical Posts In Britain and Ireland

Further reading
 

Astronomy
1596 establishments in England